Justin Henry (born May 25, 1971) is an American actor and businessman, known for playing the object of the titular custody battle in the 1979 film Kramer vs. Kramer, a debut role that earned him a nomination for the Academy Award for Best Supporting Actor, when he was eight years old. , he remains the youngest Oscar nominee in any category. The performance later earned him a spot (No. 80) on VH1's list of 100 Greatest Kid Stars. Most of his film and television credits came as a child or teenager, although he has continued acting as an adult.

Early life and education
Justin Henry was born in Rye, New York, the son of Michele (née Andrews), a real estate agent, and Clifford Henry, an investment adviser. He was educated at Brunswick School, an all-boys college-preparatory private day school located in Greenwich, Connecticut, followed by Skidmore College, a private liberal arts college in Saratoga Springs, New York, where he earned a B.A. in psychology in 1993.

Life and career

Acting career
Henry began his acting career in Kramer vs. Kramer. For his performance in that film, he became the youngest person to ever be nominated for an Oscar or Golden Globe. His next role was in a 1983 episode of the American television series Fantasy Island. On the big screen, Henry appeared in the Brat Pack film Sixteen Candles (1984), as Mike, one of main character Samantha's siblings. Henry also played the son of a married couple played by Don Johnson and Susan Sarandon in the film Sweet Hearts Dance (1988). In this role, critic Janet Maslin called him a "large and amusingly sullen teenager".

After graduation, Henry's next widely seen performance was in 1997, as a medical student in a two-episode role during the fourth season of ER. He starred opposite Ally Sheedy, Jason David Frank and Brian O'Halloran in the mockumentary The Junior Defenders, which was filmed that same year but released direct-to-video in 2007.

Business career
Henry co-founded the Slamdunk Film Festival in 1998. He continues to make occasional appearances in film and television.

Filmography

References

Bibliography 
 Holmstrom, John. The Moving Picture Boy: An International Encyclopaedia from 1895 to 1995, Norwich, Michael Russell, 1996, p. 386-387.

External links
 

1971 births
Living people
20th-century American male actors
21st-century American businesspeople
American male child actors
American male film actors
American male television actors
Brunswick School alumni
Male actors from New York (state)
People from Rye, New York
Skidmore College alumni